The Nestor Film Company, originally known as the Nestor Motion Picture Company, was an American motion picture production company. It was founded in 1909 as the West Coast production unit of the Centaur Film Company located in Bayonne, New Jersey. While not the first movie studio in Los Angeles, on October 27, 1911, Nestor established the first permanent motion picture studio in Hollywood, California, and produced the first Hollywood films. The company merged with its distributor, the Universal Film Manufacturing Company, on May 20, 1912. Nestor became a brand name Universal used until at least mid-1917.

History

The Nestor Film Company was founded in 1909 as the West Coast production unit of the Centaur Film Company located in Bayonne, New Jersey, owned and operated by David Horsley and his brother, William Horsley.

On October 27, 1911, Nestor opened the first movie studio actually located in the Hollywood area of Los Angeles. It was at the Blondeau Tavern building on the northwest corner of Sunset Boulevard and Gower Street. The first motion picture stage in Hollywood was built behind the tavern.

Other East Coast studios had moved production to Los Angeles, prior to Nestor's move west. The California weather allowed for year-round filming and the ambitious studio operated three principal divisions under its Canadian-born general manager, Al Christie. Christie moved permanently to Southern California from the East, where he had been working with the Horsleys creating the popular silent-era Mutt and Jeff comedy shorts.

One division at the Hollywood location, under director Milton H. Fahrney, made a one-reel Western picture every week while the second division, under director Tom Ricketts, turned out a one-reel drama every week. In addition to running the operation, Christie oversaw a weekly production of a one-reel Mutt and Jeff episode.

The Horsley brothers remained in New Jersey, where their laboratory and offices handled the Hollywood studio's film processing and distribution. 

Other filmmakers began opening studios in the Hollywood area. 

On May 20, 1912, the Nestor Film Company merged with the Universal Film Manufacturing Company, headed by Carl Laemmle. Several other motion picture companies, including Laemmle's Independent Moving Pictures (IMP), merged with Universal, which had been founded in April 1912. Nestor became a brand name that Universal used until at least mid-1917.

See also 
 History of the San Fernando Valley
 Rancho Providencia
 Providencia Ranch 
 Forest Lawn Memorial Park (Hollywood Hills)

References

External links

 Photo of Universal City Nov. 24 1913 by Bailey, Chas. Z. 
 Archive of the Nestor Film Company- The Silent Film Channel
 Universal Image collection on Flickr

Mass media companies established in 1909
Mass media companies disestablished in 1912
Silent film studios
Defunct American film studios
Film production companies of the United States
Film studios in Southern California
Defunct organizations based in Hollywood, Los Angeles
1909 establishments in California
1912 disestablishments in California
Articles containing video clips